7526 Ohtsuka, provisional designation , is a stony asteroid from the inner regions of the asteroid belt, approximately 7 kilometers in diameter. It was discovered by Japanese astronomer Takeshi Urata at Nihondaira Observatory Oohira Station, Japan, on 2 January 1993. The asteroid was named after Japanese astronomer Katsuhito Ohtsuka.

Orbit and classification 

Ohtsuka orbits the Sun in the inner main-belt at a distance of 1.8–3.1 AU once every 3 years and 11 months (1,416 days). Its orbit has an eccentricity of 0.26 and an inclination of 4° with respect to the ecliptic.

Physical characteristics

Rotation period 

In September 2007, a rotational lightcurve of Ohtsuka was obtained from photometric observations by Maurice Clark at the Montgomery College in Rockville, Maryland. Lightcurve analysis gave a rotation period of  hours with a brightness amplitude of 0.16 magnitude.

Diameter and albedo 

According to the surveys carried out by the Japanese Akari satellite and NASA's Wide-field Infrared Survey Explorer with its subsequent NEOWISE mission, Ohtsuka has an albedo in the range of 0.03 to 0.11 with a diameter between 6.64 and 11.34 kilometers. The Collaborative Asteroid Lightcurve Link, however assumes a standard albedo for stony asteroids of 0.20 and calculates and much smaller diameter of 4.7 kilometers.

Naming 

This minor planet was named after Japanese astronomer Katsuhito Ohtsuka (born 1959), also curator of the Tokyo Meteor Network and its meteorite collection. Ohtsuka studies the dynamics of small Solar System bodies, in particular 3200 Phaethon and 96P/Machholz with their complex members. The official naming citation was published by the Minor Planet Center on 12 July 2014.

References

External links 
 Asteroid Lightcurve Database (LCDB), query form (info )
 Dictionary of Minor Planet Names, Google books
 Asteroids and comets rotation curves, CdR – Observatoire de Genève, Raoul Behrend
 Discovery Circumstances: Numbered Minor Planets (5001)-(10000) – Minor Planet Center
 
 

007526
Discoveries by Takeshi Urata
Named minor planets
19930102